George Horsey may refer to:

 George Horsey (landowner) (died 1640), English landowner
 George Horsey (MP) (1526–1588), English politician
George Horsey (died 1645), MP
 George Horsey (priest), Dean of Ross, Ireland, 1637–1639